"I Don't Wanna Dance" is a 1982 single by Eddy Grant. It went to number one on the UK Singles Chart and held there for three weeks in November 1982. It was later released in the United States, but only reached No. 53 on the Billboard Hot 100 in late 1983.  It was later reissued as the B-side of Grant's "Electric Avenue".

The song expresses Eddy's farewell to Britain being a land of class and colour divisions. Grant explained to the Daily Telegraph on June 27, 2008: "I Don't Wanna Dance can mean that you don't want to go out on the dancefloor or it could mean that you don't want to go along with an idea. That's how I try to write: you take it how you want, but I am basically a writer of protest."

In a 1988 interview for Yugoslav RTV Revija, Grant said: "I Don't Wanna Dance was created during a tour. I was sitting in the dressing room, waiting for my concert to begin. Suddenly I put together the chords and, tone by tone, the outline of the song was born. Since I'm not an exclusively reggae, rock or pop musician, I'm not limited in my songwriting."

Written and produced by Grant, it was the most successful of his solo singles in the United Kingdom, and his first number one since "Baby Come Back" by The Equals in 1968.

Charts

Weekly charts

Year-end charts

See also 
 List of UK Singles Chart number ones of the 1980s
 List of number-one singles of the 1980s (Switzerland)
 List of number-one singles of 1982 (Ireland)

References

Eddy Grant songs
1982 singles
UK Singles Chart number-one singles
Number-one singles in South Africa
Number-one singles in Switzerland
Irish Singles Chart number-one singles
Songs about dancing
1982 songs
Number-one singles in Belgium
Number-one singles in New Zealand